Gerald Nelson (born 14 November 1941) is a South African former cricketer. He played in 59 first-class and 7 List A matches for Border from 1961/62 to 1981/82.

See also
 List of Border representative cricketers

References

External links
 

1941 births
Living people
South African cricketers
Border cricketers
People from Mthatha
Cricketers from the Eastern Cape